The qualifying heats and the finals of the Men's 100 metres Freestyle event at the European LC Championships 1995 were held on Saturday 24 August 1995 in Vienna, Austria.

Finals

See also
1993 Men's European Championships (LC) 100m Freestyle
1995 Men's World Championships (SC) 100m Freestyle
1996 Men's Olympic Games 100m Freestyle
1997 Men's European Championships (LC) 100m Freestyle

References
 scmsom results
 swimrankings
 swimmers-world

F